Ang Junyang (born August 17, 1981) is a Singaporean singer and host.

He was a contestant on Project SuperStar 2005, organized by MediaCorp, and was runner-up to the eventual winner Kelvin Tan Wei Lian in the final of the male category. After the competition, he signed a recording contract with Universal Music. He has also hosted television programmes such as SuperFunkies and Campus SuperStar together with the rest of the superstars.

His first album 《独角兽》 was officially released on May 26, 2006.

References

External links
 

1981 births
Singaporean people of Chinese descent
21st-century Singaporean male singers
Singaporean Mandopop singers
Saint Andrew's Junior College alumni
Living people